Chaiyasit Shinawatra (born 25 June 1945) is a former commander-in-chief of the Royal Thai Army.

He was transferred from the army to become a special advisor to the Supreme Command Headquarters under the administration of Prime Minister Chuan Leekpai. In August 2001, Chaiyasit was promoted to deputy commander of the Armed Forces Development Command.  In August 2002, he was promoted to the post of deputy commander-in-chief.

As a cousin of Prime Minister Thaksin Shinawatra, his unexpected appointment was criticised as an act of nepotism. Both Chaiyasit and the Defence Minister, General Chavalit Yongchaiyudh, denied accusations of nepotism: "If I'm appointed to a significant post in the Army because of my connection with the prime minister, I won't have any friends left in the armed forces," said Chaiyasit. He said that Thaksin would not interfere with any high-level military reshuffles: "It's a shame that the prime minister's name was tainted by such a groundless rumour."

He replaced General Surayud Chulanont, who was promoted to become supreme commander of the Royal Thai Armed Forces, as commander-in-chief in August 2003.

He was replaced as army chief in 2004, succeeded by Prawit Wongsuwan, and was transferred to Supreme Command. Chaisit was then replaced as supreme commander in 2005, succeeded by General Ruangroj Mararanont.

References

Chaiyasit Shinawatra
Chaiyasit Shinawatra
Chaiyasit Shinawatra
Chaiyasit Shinawatra
Hakka generals
1945 births
Living people
Chaiyasit Shinawatra
Chaiyasit Shinawatra
Chaiyasit Shinawatra
Chaiyasit Shinawatra
Chaiyasit Shinawatra
Chaiyasit Shinawatra
Chaiyasit Shinawatra
Chaiyasit Shinawatra
Chaiyasit Shinawatra
Recipients of the Darjah Utama Bakti Cemerlang (Tentera)